Pentasteron is a genus of spiders in the family Zodariidae. It was first described in 2001 by Baehr & Jocqué. , it contains 8 Australian species.

Species

Pentasteron comprises 8 species:
 P. intermedium Baehr & Jocqué, 2001 — Southern Australia
 P. isobelae Baehr & Jocqué, 2001 — Australia (Queensland, New South Wales)
 P. oscitans Baehr & Jocqué, 2001 — Australia (New South Wales)
 P. parasimplex Baehr & Jocqué, 2001 — Australia (Victoria)
 P. securifer Baehr & Jocqué, 2001 — Australia (Western Australia)
 P. simplex Baehr & Jocqué, 2001 (type) — Australia (Queensland, New South Wales)
 P. sordidum Baehr & Jocqué, 2001 — Australia (New South Wales, Victoria)
 P. storosoides Baehr & Jocqué, 2001 — Australia (New South Wales, Victoria)

References

Zodariidae
Araneomorphae genera
Spiders of Australia